Darab is a city in Fars Province, Iran.

Darab or Dar-e Ab may also refer to various places in Iran:
 Darab, East Azerbaijan
 Darab, Ilam
 Darab, Zarand, Kerman Province (داراب - Dārāb)
 Darab, Kermanshah (دراب - Darāb)
 Darab, Dalahu, Kermanshah Province
 Darab, Razavi Khorasan
 Darab, West Azerbaijan
 Darab County, in Fars Province

See also
 Darabi (disambiguation)